was a Japanese actor.

He attended Musashino Art University, but withdrew before completing his degree. In 1964, he joined Bungakuza Theatre Company but left in 1977.

He is well known for his role as Chōsan (Detective Tarō Nozaki) in the detective drama television series Taiyō ni Hoero!. His notable films are The Sands of Kurobe (1968), Akira Kurosawas film Dodes'ka-den (1970) and Kimi yo Fundo no Kawa o Watare  (1976).

Selected filmography

Films
The Sands of Kurobe (1968) 
Portrait of Hell (1969)
Dodes'ka-den (1970) 
Karei-naru Ichizoku (1974) 
Failed Youth aka Bitterness of Youth (1974)
Prophecies of Nostradamus  (1974) 
Kimi yo Fundo no Kawa o Watare  (1976) 
Bandits vs. Samurai Squadron (1978) 
A Distant Cry from Spring  (1980) 
The Catch (1983) 
Boku to, bokura no natsu (1990)
Edo Jō Tairan (1991) 
After the Rain (1999)

Television
Ten to Chi to (1969)
Haru no Sakamichi (TV series) (1971)    
Taiyō ni Hoero!  (1972–1982, 1987) – Taro Nozaki
Kunitori Monogatari (1973)
Ronin of the Wilderness (1974) (2nd season, ep. 22 and 39)
Oretachi wa Tenshi da! (1979)    
Choshichiro Edo Nikki (1983-1991) - Miyake Kakubei
School Wars: Hero  (1984)  – Yamashiro
Ponytail wa Furimukanai (1986)

References

1928 births
2004 deaths
Japanese male actors
People from Fukuoka